Flamingos is Enrique Bunbury's third studio album.

Track listing

References 

2002 albums
Enrique Bunbury albums